Castanopsis catappaefolia is a species of plant in the family Fagaceae. It is a tree endemic to Peninsular Malaysia. It is threatened by habitat loss.

References

catappaefolia
Endemic flora of Peninsular Malaysia
Trees of Peninsular Malaysia
Critically endangered plants
Taxonomy articles created by Polbot
Taxobox binomials not recognized by IUCN